David Dinsmore (born 2 September 1968) is a Scottish newspaper executive and a former editor of The Sun newspaper. Dinsmore grew up in Glasgow, and began working for News International at the age of 22.

Early career 
Dinsmore was employed by the Clydebank Post and then later he worked as a reporter for the Eastwood Mercury, Milngavie Herald and Kirkintilloch Herald newspapers.

In 1991 Dinsmore became a casual reporter for the Scottish Sun newspaper. At the same time he began a degree in business management at Paisley University. His first full-time role as a reporter came with the Daily Star in their Edinburgh office.

Career with News Corp 
Dinsmore returned to the Scottish Sun as a reporter in 1994, he then rose through the ranks of that paper to become sub-editor, then chief sub-editor. and made the move to London after becoming picture editor of the News of the World under Phil Hall.

In 2004, Dinsmore became night editor of The Sun, and in 2006, he was appointed editor of the Scottish edition of the paper, serving until 2010. During that time he took a general management course at Columbia Business School. He then became general manager of the paper in Scotland, then in quick succession managing editor in London, and director of operations for News International.

Dinsmore was appointed editor of The Sun in June 2013, replacing Dominic Mohan.

Following his appointment to the job, he faced criticism as a result of the growing support for the No More Page 3 campaign, which challenged the appropriateness of bare breasts in the family newspaper. In November 2013, he stated that he had no intention of dropping the Page 3 feature, despite the pressure from campaign supporters including politicians, celebrities and student bodies. In December 2014, Dinsmore was named sexist of the year by End Violence Against Women. The Page 3 feature of a topless women came to end in January 2015.

Under his editorship The Suns online presence went behind a paywall, however Dinsmore is credited with growing the online subscriber base, doubling the number of paying customers from an initial 117,000 to 225,000. Dinsmore has won also plaudits from the media industry, ranking at 27 in the 2014 Media Guardian 100, and at 67 in GQ magazine's 2015 'Most Connected Men in Britain' list.

On 2 September 2015 Dinsmorre was promoted to Chief Operating Officer of News UK, and Tony Gallagher succeeded him as editor of The Sun.

See also 

 The Sun newspaper

References 

1968 births
Living people
British male journalists
British newspaper editors
Journalists from Glasgow
People educated at Strathallan School
The Sun (United Kingdom) editors
Alumni of the University of the West of Scotland
Columbia Business School alumni
Chief operating officers